Therese Nilshagen (born 24 January 1983) is a Swedish dressage rider. At the European Championships in Gothenburg 2017, she won team silver and at the Rotterdam 2019, she won team bronze, both with the black stallion Dante Weltino OLD. In 2016 she was selected for the 2016 Olympic Games in Rio de Janeiro, but during the vet-check, the horse was not fit, so she was replaced by fellow team rider Mads Hendeliowitz.

In 2021, Nilshagen was part of the Swedish Olympic team during the 2020 Summer Olympics in Tokyo, finished 14th in the individual final and 6th with the team.

Biography
Nilshagen started riding at an age of 8 at the local riding school in Sweden. Her international debut was in 2015 in Cappeln on Small Tour Level. In 2016 she competed for the first time at international Grand Prix level. That same year she was selected for the Swedish Olympic team. She is currently based in Germany. Nilshagen is fluent in Swedish, German, English and Finnish.

References

Living people
1983 births
Swedish female equestrians
Swedish dressage riders
Equestrians at the 2020 Summer Olympics
Olympic equestrians of Sweden
Sportspeople from Stockholm